Manja Satta Pacha Satta is a 2021 Indian Tamil-language satirical film directed by Thamba Kutti Bambrosky and starring Guru Somasundaram, Adithya Varman and Renu Soundar.

Plot

Cast 
Guru Somasundaram
Adithya Varman
Renu Soundar

Production and release 
Writer Thamba Kutti Bambrosky, known for his short story Kalki, made his directorial debut with this film, which was made in the Neo-Burlesque genre. Guru Somasundaram plays a politician in the film. The film was scheduled to release in 2020 but was delayed.

Reception 
A critic from Nettv4u opined that "Manja Satta Pacha Satta is an okayish movie with some good performances and comedy". A critic from Maalai Malar called the film a comedy riot.

References

External links 
 

2020s satirical films
2020s Tamil-language films
Indian satirical films